U-113 may refer to one of the following German submarines:

 , a Type U 93 submarine launched in 1917 that served in the First World War and was surrendered in 1918
 During the First World War, Germany also had this submarine with a similar name:
 , a Type UB III submarine launched in 1917 and disappeared in 1918
 , would have been a Type XIB submarine, a large cruiser-type submarine capable of carrying an Arado Ar 231 aircraft; laid down in 1939, but cancelled after the outbreak of the Second World War

Submarines of Germany